The Granville Street Bridge or Granville Bridge is an eight-lane fixed  cantilever/truss bridge in Vancouver, British Columbia, carrying Granville Street between Downtown Vancouver southwest and the Fairview neighborhood. The bridge is part of Highway 99.

History

First bridge 1889
The original bridge was completed in 1889. It was a 732-metre long low timber trestle. The navigation span, near the north end, was a trussed timber swing span, tied with wire ropes to a central wooden tower. It was largely designed by the CPR, and cost $16,000. In 1891 the bridge was widened on both sides for streetcar tracks, except where the tracks converged for the swing span.

Second bridge 1909
The second bridge was completed in 1909. It was a longer, medium-level steel bridge with a through truss swing span. During World War I, on April 29, 1915, a fire broke out on the bridge that was thought to be an arson attack. Four Germans were arrested.

Third bridge 1954
On February 4, 1954, the current Granville Street Bridge, costing $16.5 million, opened. A million cars would cross over the bridge in its first month. The city of Vancouver funded the bridge itself as Mayor Frederick Hume said "no formal assistance given by any other government body."

The eight-lane structure was constructed on the same alignment as the first bridge while steel plate girders salvaged from the second bridge made barges for constructing the foundations of the Oak Street Bridge.

The first "civilian" to drive over the 1954 bridge was the same woman who was first to drive over the second bridge in 1909. She had been widowed between the two openings, and so had a different name. Both times she was at the wheel of a brand-new Cadillac.

Recent improvements to the bridge include increasing its earthquake resistance, and installing higher curbs and median barriers.

Future

In December 2017, Vancouver City Council approved a plan to remove the "Granville Loops" - a pair of cloverleaf off-ramps connecting the bridge with Pacific Street - and open up the land to redevelopment.

The Granville Street underwent a seismic retrofit that began in late 2018 and was completed in September 2021.

In January 2019, Vancouver City Council announced a plan to improve pedestrian and cyclist access to the bridge from the surrounding neighbourhoods by creating a new separated bike and walking path located in the centre of the bridge roadway. The plan was opened up for public comment in April 2019 with the project approved. Construction on the pedestrian and bicycle lanes began in February 2023 and is expected to take two years to complete.

Gallery

See also
 List of bridges in Canada
 Spinning Chandelier

Resources
 History of Metropolitan Vancouver
 Bridges of Greater Vancouver

References

External links

Footage of the demolition of the second bridge and construction of the third Granville Street Bridge, 1954, City of Vancouver Archives
1954 film clip taken from a car driving over the bridge

Truss arch bridges
Bridges in Greater Vancouver
Bridges completed in 1889
Bridges completed in 1909
Bridges completed in 1954
Road bridges in British Columbia
Buildings and structures in Vancouver